Federico Grisone was a Neapolitan nobleman and one of the first masters of dressage and courtly riding. Referred to in his time as the "father of the art of equitation", he wrote the first book on this subject to be published in early modern Europe.

Life 

Grisone started a riding academy in Naples in 1532, and in 1550 published the influential Gli ordini di cavalcare, "The Rules of Riding", one of the first works on horsemanship since the time of Xenophon. This work was a best-seller of its time. Between 1550 and 1623, twenty-one Italian editions were printed; fifteen translated editions were published in French, seven in German, one in Spanish and six in English. The earliest of these, The arte of ryding and breakinge greate horses, an abridged and adapted translation made by Thomas Blundeville at the suggestion of John Astley and published with plates from the original in 1560, is the earliest book in English on equitation.

Grisone was admired and respected as a great master of his time. Caracciolo wrote of him in 1566:  His training methods profoundly influenced the training of horses in his day, and were spread into France by Giovanni Battista Pignatelli and his pupils Salomon de la Broue and Antoine de Pluvinel. Today his methods are criticised, particularly outside Italy, for their sometimes harsh treatment of the horse.

Theories on riding and training 

Grisone is well known for his rather forceful, sometimes cruel, methods of training. He was influenced by the famous general Xenophon, especially in the positioning of the rider's seat and aids, but he appears to have given up the part where Greek master advocates the gentle training and riding of the horse.

There are several cases in his book "Gli Ordini di Cavalcare," or The Rules of Horsemanship, first published in 1550, where he applies severe practices. He used harsh methods to subdue the horse, using severe spurring and harsh bits (of some of which he was the inventor). Other examples of his cruel methods include placing live hedgehogs under the animal's tail, punishing a horse by placing a cat strapped to a pole under its belly, and forcing the horse's head under water to the point of near-drowning if it showed any fear of crossing water.

Grisone was not an advocate  of the now "classical" position that was first suggested by Xenophon, and instead preferred the rider to sit with his feet pushed well forward.

Grisone was considered a master of his time, and his training methods had a great impact on the training of horses of his day. They spread into France, thanks to Salomon de la Broue and Giovanni Battista Pignatelli. However, later masters such as Antoine de Pluvinel, restored the ideas of gentle training of the horse.

Principal early editions 

 . Napoli: Giovan Paolo Suganappo, 1550. Also Venice 1551, 1552, 1571; Pesaro 1554, 1555, 1556, 1558.
 François de Lorraine, duc de Guise (translator), . A Paris, chez Charles Perier, à l'enseigne de Bellerophon, rue Sainct Jean de Beauvais 1559. iv, 150pp. Also Paris 1561, 1563, 1575, 1579, 1585, 1610, 1615; Lyon 1584; Tournon 1599.
 Thomas Blundeville (translator), . London: Willyam Seres, [1560?].
 Johann Fayser den Jüngern von Arnstain (translator), . Augspurg: Getruckt durch M. Manger in Verlegung G. Willers, 1570. Also 1573.

References 

Classical horsemanship
Dressage trainers
Writers on horsemanship